Saxon Gregory-Hunt (born 11 May 1993) is a New Zealand male weightlifter, competing in the 85 kg category and representing New Zealand at international competitions. He participated at the 2014 Commonwealth Games in the 85 kg event.

Major competitions

References

1993 births
Living people
New Zealand male weightlifters
Place of birth missing (living people)
Weightlifters at the 2014 Commonwealth Games
Commonwealth Games competitors for New Zealand